Czerwony Dwór (meaning "red manor") may refer to:
 Polish name for Raudondvaris in Lithuania
Czerwony Dwór, Greater Poland Voivodeship (west-central Poland)
Czerwony Dwór, Pomeranian Voivodeship (north Poland)
Czerwony Dwór, Olecko County in Warmian-Masurian Voivodeship (north Poland)
Czerwony Dwór, Węgorzewo County in Warmian-Masurian Voivodeship (north Poland)